Kozubów Landscape Park (Kozubowski Park Krajobrazowy) is a protected area (Landscape Park) in south-central Poland, covering an area of .

The Park lies within Świętokrzyskie Voivodeship: in Kazimierza County (Gmina Czarnocin) and Pińczów County (Gmina Pińczów, Gmina Działoszyce, Gmina Michałów, Gmina Złota). It takes its name from the village of Kozubów in Gmina Pińczów.

Within the Landscape Park are two nature reserves.

References 

Landscape parks in Poland
Parks in Świętokrzyskie Voivodeship
Pińczów County